Bogdan-Andrei Doroftei (born 13 November 1995) is a Romanian rugby union football player. He plays as a lock for professional SuperLiga club Steaua București.

Career
Before playing for Steaua, Bogdan Doroftei played for CSS Bârlad.

References

External links

1995 births
Living people
Sportspeople from Bârlad
Romanian rugby union players
CSA Steaua București (rugby union) players
Rugby union locks